Miguel Romero (Melilla, 1945 — Madrid, January 26, 2014) was a Spanish activist and politician.

Romero died in Madrid from cancer.

References

1945 births
2014 deaths
Spanish politicians